Joseph Franco (born January 26, 1990) is an American soccer player.

Career
Franco spent all five years of his collegiate career at Cal State Northridge and also spent the 2012 season with USL Premier Development League club Los Angeles Misioneros.

On January 22, 2013 Franco was drafted by Chivas USA in the second round (21st overall) of the 2013 MLS Supplemental Draft. However, he wasn't signed by the club due to injury.

Franco signed his first professional contract with USL Pro club LA Galaxy II. He was later signed by Orange County Soccer Club in Orange County, California. During his 26 appearances, he led the team in minutes played.

As of May 2021, Franco is a coach with the LA Galaxy OC youth club.

Personal life 
Joe is currently engaged to college girlfriend and soccer player Amanda Smith. They are due to wed in 2019. He currently works as a financial advisor in Southern California.

References

1990 births
Living people
American soccer players
Association football defenders
Cal State Northridge Matadors men's soccer players
Chivas USA draft picks
LA Galaxy II players
LA Laguna FC players
Miami FC players
Orange County SC players
People from Monrovia, California
Soccer players from California
Sportspeople from Los Angeles County, California
USL Championship players
USL League Two players
High school soccer coaches in the United States